Sofia Anna "Sonya" Kenin (born November 14, 1998) is an American professional tennis player. She has a career-high ranking by the Women's Tennis Association (WTA) of No. 4 in the world, which she achieved on March 9, 2020. She was the 2020 WTA Player of the Year, an award she earned by winning the 2020 Australian Open and finishing runner-up at the 2020 French Open. Kenin has won another four singles and two doubles titles on the WTA Tour, including the 2019 China Open at the Premier Mandatory-level with Bethanie Mattek-Sands.

Kenin was a child prodigy who drew the attention of veteran coach Rick Macci at the age of five and became a celebrity in the tennis community soon after. Coached primarily by her father, Kenin developed into a promising junior player, reaching No. 2 in the world after winning the Orange Bowl at the age of 16 and finishing runner-up in the 2015 US Open girls' singles event the following year. She also won the USTA Girls 18s National Championship during that summer. On the professional tour, Kenin made her debut in the top 100 of the WTA rankings in 2018 as a teenager. She won her first three titles in 2019 and finished the year just outside the top 10. With her title at the 2020 Australian Open, Kenin became the youngest American to win a major women's singles title since Serena Williams in 1999. At the end of the 2019 season, she followed up her Most Improved Player of the Year WTA award by being named the WTA Player of the Year of 2020.

Early life and background
Sofia Kenin was born in Moscow to Alexander and Svetlana Kenin. Her family moved to the United States a few months after she was born. They had previously left the Soviet Union to live in New York City in 1987 but returned to Russia for Kenin's birth so that other family members could help raise her initially. Her mother had worked as a nurse in the Soviet Union, and her parents had only $286 when they first moved to the United States.

Kenin began playing tennis at the age of five, drawing inspiration from her father who had played recreationally. Her parents recognized her potential and arranged for her to begin training with Rick Macci in Broward County, Florida. Macci coached Kenin for seven years until she was 12. He remarked: "Back then [when Kenin was five], I came right out and said Sofia was the scariest little creature I’d ever seen. It was unique: the hand-eye coordination and her ability to take the ball immediately right after the bounce. I have a lot of kids do that, but it was almost like it was baked in already, even though she was little and the racket was actually bigger than her. The only player I’ve seen like that is [former world No. 1] Martina Hingis." Kenin has also worked with Nick Bollettieri. Her primary coach had always been her father until May 2021.

Kenin had success in tennis at a young age, which garnered widespread attention in the tennis community and helped put her on the covers of tennis magazines. Kenin began playing in United States Tennis Association (USTA) girls' 10-and-under tournaments at the age of seven, and became the top-ranked player in Florida in that division. She later was ranked No. 1 in the USTA national rankings for each of the 12, 14, 16, and 18-and-under divisions. Kenin had the opportunity to interact with ATP and WTA professional tennis players as a young child, including hitting with Anna Kournikova at age seven, partnering with Jim Courier against Venus Williams and Todd Martin as part of an exhibition event, and receiving a tour of the Miami Open from Kim Clijsters.

Junior career

Kenin reached a career-high of No. 2 in the ITF junior rankings. She began playing in low-level Grade-4 events on the ITF Junior Circuit in 2012 at the age of 13. After winning her first titles in both singles and doubles in 2013, she progressed to the Grade 1 level. Towards the end of the year, she made her Grade-A debut at the Orange Bowl, reaching the semifinals in singles and finishing runner-up in doubles with Kaitlyn McCarthy to Tornado Alicia Black and Naiktha Bains. Kenin made her junior Grand Slam debut in 2014, but only recorded one match win in singles while playing in the latter three events of the year. Following the US Open, Kenin represented the United States at the Junior Fed Cup along with CiCi Bellis and Black. The team won the tournament, sweeping Slovakia 3–0 in the final. Kenin went undefeated in her five matches, all in doubles. Her next breakthrough came toward the end of the year when she won the Orange Bowl, defeating Bellis and Ingrid Neel in the last two rounds.

Kenin built on that success in 2015 by winning the USTA International Spring Championships, a Grade-1 tournament. During the summer, she won the USTA Girls 18s National Championship as the No. 3 seed, defeating the No. 1 seed Black in the final. With the title, she earned a wildcard into the main draw of the 2015 US Open. Kenin also participated in the junior event at the US Open and finished runner-up to Dalma Gálfi, her best performance at a junior Grand Slam event. This result helped her rise to No. 2 in the world by the end of the year. Kenin continued to play on the junior tour in 2016 while primarily playing in professional events on the ITF Women's Circuit. At the US Open, she again produced one of her best results of the year, losing in the semifinals to Viktória Kužmová, after upsetting the No. 1 seed Anastasia Potapova in the previous round.

Professional career

2013–17: US Open debut, three ITF Circuit titles

Kenin began playing low-level tournaments on the ITF Women's Circuit in 2013 and won her first two professional matches at the age of 14. With her wildcard from winning the USTA Junior National Championship, she made her Grand Slam debut at the 2015 US Open, losing her opening match to Mariana Duque-Mariño. The following year, Kenin won her first two ITF titles, the first at a $25k event in Wesley Chapel in Florida and the second at a $50k Sacramento Challenger in California. The latter title helped her win the US Open Wild Card Challenge to earn a wildcard into the main draw of the US Open for the second time. At the US Open, she lost her first-round match to Karolína Plíšková, her only WTA Tour-level match of the year.

After beginning the 2017 season ranked outside the top 200, Kenin steadily rose up the WTA rankings throughout the year while playing exclusively on the professional circuit. She progressed into the top 150 in August after a string of good results during the summer, including winning the $60k Stockton Challenger and finishing runner-up at the $60k Lexington Challenger. These ITF performances helped her win the US Open Wild Card Challenge for the second straight year. At the 2017 US Open, Kenin advanced beyond the first round of a Grand Slam tournament for the first time, defeating compatriots Lauren Davis and Sachia Vickery, before losing to the 2006 champion Maria Sharapova in the third round. These were also her first two match wins on WTA Tour. Kenin's success at the US Open helped convince her to turn professional in September, foregoing a scholarship to attend the University of Miami. She finished the year ranked No. 108 in the world.

2018: Top 50, first top-10 victory

With her improved ranking, Kenin was able to play primarily on the WTA Tour in 2018. She began the year by reaching her first WTA quarterfinal at the Auckland Open. After losing her first-round match at the Australian Open, Kenin produced good results at both Premier Mandatory events in March. She entered the top 100 by reaching the second round of the Indian Wells Open as a qualifier. She then qualified for the Miami Open, where she upset No. 11 Daria Kasatkina and reached the third round. After losing all five of her WTA Tour matches on clay across main draws and qualifying, Kenin reached her first WTA semifinal at the Mallorca Open on grass. She defeated top seed and world No. 6, Caroline Garcia, for her first career top-ten victory before losing to Tatjana Maria. Kenin closed out the grass-court season with a second-round appearance at Wimbledon, winning her debut at the event against Maria Sakkari.

Back in the United States, Kenin won another $60k title at the Berkeley Club Challenge. She reached the third round of the US Open for the second consecutive year, losing to Plíšková at the event for the second time. Kenin's best performance during the rest of the season came at the Tournoi de Québec, where she reached another semifinal. She defeated world No. 10, Julia Görges, at the Wuhan Open for her second top-ten victory of the year. So she advanced into the top 50 for the first time.

2019: Three WTA Tour titles, world No. 12
Kenin greatly improved in 2019, rising from outside the top 50 at the start of the year to just outside the top ten by the end of the season. She began her year by winning her first WTA doubles title at the Auckland Open with Eugenie Bouchard. The following week, she won her first WTA singles title at the Hobart International without dropping a set during the event. She upset the top seed and No. 19 Caroline Garcia in the first round, before defeating Anna Karolína Schmiedlová in the final. With this success, Kenin rose to what was at the time a career-best ranking of No. 37. At the Australian Open, she pushed world No. 1 Simona Halep to three sets in the second round, ultimately losing in a long two-hour-and-thirty-minute match. The following month, Kenin reached another WTA final at the Mexican Open, finishing runner-up to Wang Yafan despite being up a set and a break. During the clay-court season, Kenin improved on her results from the previous year. She reached the third round at the Italian Open, defeating compatriot Madison Keys before losing to Plíšková. Her best result on clay came at the French Open, where she reached the fourth round. During the event, she upset world No. 10, Serena Williams, in the third round before losing to eventual champion Ashleigh Barty.

In the grass-court season, Kenin won her second WTA singles title of the year at the Mallorca Open. She defeated three top-25 players in the final three rounds, all in three sets. She saved three championship points in the second set of the final against No. 13 Belinda Bencic, before coming from behind to win the match. Although she was seeded for the first time at a major at No. 27, she lost in the second round of Wimbledon to Dayana Yastremska. Kenin's best results of the US Open Series came at the two Premier 5 tournaments, where she reached the semifinals at both the Canadian Open and the Cincinnati Open, losing to the eventual champions at each but defeating the current world No. 1 players, Ashleigh Barty and Naomi Osaka, at each event, her first two victories over top-ranked players. She also became the first player to defeat the world No. 1 in back-to-back weeks since Lindsay Davenport had done so in 2001. Following these tournaments, Kenin again lost to Keys in the third round of the US Open.

During the Asian hardcourt swing, Kenin won one additional title in both singles and doubles. She won her third singles title of the year at the Guangzhou International Women's Open, defeating Samantha Stosur in the final. Two weeks later, she partnered with Bethanie Mattek-Sands to win her second doubles title of the year at the China Open, a Premier Mandatory event. There, the pair defeated the team of Aryna Sabalenka and Elise Mertens, who were ranked No. 2 and No. 3 in the world, respectively, at the time. This title brought her to No. 43 in the doubles rankings. At the end of the season, Kenin qualified for the WTA Elite Trophy as the second seed, ranked No. 12 in the world. She won her opening match against compatriot Alison Riske, but lost to Karolína Muchová and did not advance out of her round-robin group. Kenin was also named the second alternate at the WTA Finals, behind Kiki Bertens. After Naomi Osaka and Bianca Andreescu both withdrew, she had the opportunity to play one match, losing to defending champion Elina Svitolina. She finished the year ranked No. 14 in singles and No. 39 in doubles. Kenin also received the WTA award Most Improved Player of the Year for her breakthrough season, becoming the first American player to win the award since Serena Williams in 1999.

2020: Australian Open champion, world No. 4
Kenin carried her success at the lower-level tournaments in 2019 to the Grand Slam tournaments in 2020. Despite two second-round losses to start the year, Kenin won the Australian Open for her first Grand Slam singles title. She only dropped one set before the final – in the fourth round against compatriot Coco Gauff. In the semifinal, she upset world No. 1 and home favorite Ash Barty. She then defeated Garbiñe Muguruza in the final, coming from a set down. With the victory at just 21 years old, she became the youngest American woman to win a major singles title since Serena Williams won Wimbledon in 2002. Serena won the US Open in 1999 at 17 years old. She also became the youngest American to make her top-ten debut in the WTA rankings since Williams in 1999, rising to No. 7 in the world. Kenin won another title at the inaugural Lyon Open, where she saved a match point in the second round and overcame a set and 5–2 deficit in the following round as part of a stretch of four consecutive three-set matches. She defeated Anna-Lena Friedsam in the final. This was Kenin's last event before the WTA Tour shut down for six months because of the COVID-19 pandemic. At this point, she was No. 4 in the world, her career-best ranking at the time.

When the tour resumed, Kenin was seeded second at the US Open as Barty and Halep had withdrawn because of the pandemic. Although she lost in the fourth round to Elise Mertens, this was her best result at the event to date. Following the tournament, Kenin traveled to Europe for the rescheduled clay-court season. Although she lost her only tune-up match to US Open runner-up Victoria Azarenka without winning a game, Kenin continued her Grand Slam tournament success at the French Open. She won four three-set matches during the first five rounds before defeating No. 11, Petra Kvitová, in the semifinals. She lost the final in straight sets to Iga Świątek. At the end of the season, Kenin was awarded the WTA Player of the Year.

2021: Struggles with form
Kenin's first tournament of the year was at Abu Dhabi, where she was the top seed. She defeated Yang Zhaoxuan in the first round, and was the beneficiary of a retirement by Kirsten Flipkens in the second round. In the third round, Kenin saved a match point against Yulia Putintseva to progress to the quarterfinals, where she faced Maria Sakkari. After winning the first set 6–2, and with the score in the second set 2–2, Kenin lost ten games in a row, ending her run at Abu Dhabi. Her next tournament was the Yarra Valley Classic in Melbourne, where she defeated Camila Giorgi and Jessica Pegula to reach the quarterfinals. She met Garbiñe Muguruza in a rematch of the Australian Open final, but Kenin won just four games.

At the Australian Open, Kenin was the defending champion and fourth seed. She defeated Australian wildcard player Maddison Inglis in the first round but was upset by the unseeded Kaia Kanepi in the second, in straight sets. Kenin's loss was the earliest for a defending champion at the Australian Open since Jennifer Capriati lost in the first round in 2003. After the match, Kenin tearfully admitted that the pressure of defending her title was overwhelming, saying: "I feel like everyone was always asking me: 'Would you want to? Do you see yourself getting [to Melbourne] and winning again?' Obviously I said yes. With the way I’m playing, no."

She then received a wildcard for the Phillip Island Trophy, a tournament for players who suffered an early exit at the Australian Open, where she was the top seed and in receipt of a first-round bye. In the second round, Kenin was upset by the unranked Australian wildcard Olivia Gadecki in three sets. Losing to Gadecki, whose career-high ranking was No. 988, marked Kenin's worst defeat by ranking on the WTA Tour. With her disappointing results throughout the Australian summer, her ranking would have fallen to No. 13 in the world, but because of changes to the system introduced as a result of the pandemic, this did not occur.

Withdrawing from numerous tournaments after suffering from appendicitis, Kenin made her return at Miami, where, with a first-round bye, she defeated Andrea Petkovic before falling to Ons Jabeur in three sets. At Charleston, she lost in her first match against Lauren Davis. She suffered a second-round defeat at Stuttgart to Anett Kontaveit, and lost her first match at Rome to Barbora Krejčíková. At the French Open, she reached the fourth round, defeating Jeļena Ostapenko, Hailey Baptiste and Jessica Pegula, before falling to Maria Sakkari.

In May 2021, Kenin announced that she was parting ways with her father as coach. Because of an injury, she did not participate in any warmup events before Wimbledon. At Wimbledon, she defeated Wang Xinyu in the first round before losing to Madison Brengle in the second round. In the loss, Kenin set a new Wimbledon record by committing 41 unforced errors in just 45 minutes.

On 9 November 2021, Kenin announced that her father had returned to her coaching team as she prepared for the 2022 Australian Open. She finished the year ranked No. 12 in singles.

2022: Injury and hiatus, out of top 200
Seeded 11th at the Australian Open, Kenin faced and lost to Madison Keys, in straight sets in the first round. Because she was defending the maximum points she earned from winning the tournament in 2020 rather than the 70 points she earned from losing in the second round in 2021 (due to the WTA rankings freeze along with the COVID-19 pandemic), her world ranking plummeted to No. 95 when updated following the conclusion of the tournament on 31 January 2022.

Kenin made her way to the quarterfinals of Adelaide 1 where she lost to the top-seeded Ash Barty, in straight sets. This marked her first appearance at a quarterfinal since Melbourne 2021. Despite her run in Adelaide, Kenin lost five consecutive first-round matches with four of those five losses coming in straight sets.

She injured herself and pulled out of all the major tournaments in March, April and May after the Indian Wells Open including the French Open and Wimbledon. As a result, her ranking dropped outside the top 300.

2023
Kenin had a good start for 2023 season by reaching the semifinals at the Hobart International. At the 2023 Australian Open, she lost in the first round to Victoria Azarenka in a match lasting more than two hours.

At the 2023 BNP Paribas Open she defeated Sloane Stephens in the first round.

National representation

After winning the Junior Fed Cup in 2014, Kenin was nominated for her first senior Fed Cup tie in the 2018 final against the Czech Republic. Both teams were missing their best players, with the Williams sisters, Sloane Stephens, and Madison Keys for the United States, as well as Plíšková and Petra Kvitová for the Czech Republic all unavailable. Kenin and Alison Riske were selected to play singles against Barbora Strýcová and Kateřina Siniaková. Kenin lost both of her singles matches in three sets, as the Czech Republic swept the tie 3–0 to win the Fed Cup. The decisive third rubber between Kenin and Siniaková was particularly close. The match lasted 3 hours and 45 minutes, and ended with Siniaková needing to save two match points on Kenin's serve in the third set before coming from behind to win.

Kenin represented the United States again in 2019. In the first round against Australia, she lost her only match to Ashleigh Barty who won both of her singles rubbers as well as the decisive doubles rubber to lead Australia to a 3–2 victory. The United States' next tie was against Switzerland as part of the World Group Play-offs. After Keys lost the first match and Stephens won both of her singles rubbers, Kenin was selected to play the last singles rubber against Timea Bacsinszky. Kenin defeated Bacsinszky to win the tie 3–1 and keep the United States in the World Group for 2020.

With a new format in 2020 and the name of the Fed Cup competition changing to the Billie Jean King Cup mid-season, Kenin played in the Qualifying Round in a tie against Latvia a week after winning the 2020 Australian Open. After defeating Anastasija Sevastova and losing to Jeļena Ostapenko, Kenin partnered with Bethanie Mattek-Sands to defeat the two of them in the decisive doubles rubber. The United States advanced to the Billie Jean King Cup Finals where they were drawn in a round-robin group with Spain and Slovakia.

Playing style
Kenin has an aggressive style of play that is built around incorporating a variety of shots into her game rather than just power. She plays primarily from the baseline and can hit winners with both her forehand and backhand. She excels at disguising whether her backhand is going cross-court or down the line. Two of Kenin's best shots are her backhand down the line and her inside-in forehand. Kenin can strategically add slice to her backhand, which she may use to hit well-disguised drop shot winners. On occasion, she can also hit slice forehands, a rare shot in modern tennis. On the defensive side, Kenin is capable of hitting her forehand even as high as shoulder height. Petra Kvitová noticed Kenin's aggressive and determined style of play in early 2018, a trait that Kenin's father said that she had developed in 2017, her first full year on the professional tour. She had previously been described by Maria Sharapova as more of a "grinder," that is, a counter-puncher who has good movement and gets a lot of balls back in play without trying to end points.

One of the keys to Kenin's style of play is consistency, in particular with redirecting shots. Her childhood coach Rick Macci has praised her determination. He has called her "the mosquito," saying, "She’s just there the whole time, bothering you. She’s had this innate mental strength since she was a little kid. It was already baked in there." Macci also stated: "Her timing of the ball is better than anybody I ever taught. You’ll notice she’s not out of balance that much, and she can take the ball right off the bounce like a wizard. Everyone can hit deep, but the angles she gets, even while taking the ball early, are so acute that she gets you off the court, and then she goes for the jugular." Kenin has an unusual service motion in that she looks downward initially during her ball toss.

Endorsements
Between 2018 and 2022, Kenin was endorsed by Fila for her clothing and shoes, having previously been sponsored by Nike. Since 2022, Kenin has been sponsored by the American athletics company Free People Movement. Kenin's racket sponsor is Babolat, and she uses the Pure Drive model. In January 2021, Kenin signed an endorsement deal with American consumer electronics and telecommunications company Motorola.

Personal life
Kenin has a younger sister. Her childhood tennis idols were Serena Williams and Maria Sharapova. Kenin particularly has praised Sharapova's fierce competitiveness.

Outside of the WTA Tour, Kenin has participated in World TeamTennis. She led the Philadelphia Freedoms to a first-place regular-season finish in 2020 with a 10–4 record in singles. Although she defeated CoCo Vandeweghe in the semifinals, her team lost to the eventual champion New York Empire.

Career statistics

Grand Slam tournament performance timelines

Singles

Doubles

Grand Slam tournament finals

Singles: 2 (1 title, 1 runner-up)

References

External links

 
 
 
 

1998 births
American female tennis players
Grand Slam (tennis) champions in women's singles
Living people
Russian emigrants to the United States
Tennis players from Moscow
Sportspeople from Pembroke Pines, Florida
Tennis players at the 2014 Summer Youth Olympics
Australian Open (tennis) champions
21st-century American women
World number 1 ranked female tennis players